Lab Band may refer to:

 Black Lab, the alternative rock band from Berkeley, CA
 The Lab, electronic/synthpop band from Sydney, Australia
 LAB, the alternative rock band from Helsinki
 One O'Clock Lab Band, the big band (jazz) from the University of North Texas College of Music
 Two O'Clock Lab Band, the big band (jazz) from the University of North Texas College of Music